Peter Michael Stephan Hacker (born 15 July 1939) is a British philosopher.
His principal expertise is in the philosophy of mind, philosophy of language, and philosophical anthropology.  He is known for his detailed exegesis and interpretation of the philosophy of Ludwig Wittgenstein, his critique of cognitive neuroscience, and for his comprehensive studies of human nature.

Professional biography
Hacker is Jewish by heritage. Hacker studied philosophy, politics and economics at The Queen's College, Oxford, from 1960 to 1963. In 1963–65 he was senior scholar at St Antony's College, Oxford, where he began graduate work under the supervision of H. L. A. Hart. His D.Phil. thesis "Rules and Duties" was completed in 1966 during a junior research fellowship at Balliol College, Oxford.

Since 1966 Hacker has been a fellow of St John's College, Oxford, and a member of the Oxford University philosophy faculty. His visiting positions at other universities include Makerere College, Uganda (1968); Swarthmore College, US (1973 and 1986); University of Michigan, (1974); Milton C. Scott visiting professor at Queen's University, Kingston, Canada (1985); visiting fellow in humanities at University of Bologna, Italy (2009).
From 1985 to 1987 he was a British Academy Research Reader in the Humanities. In 1991–94 he was a Leverhulme Trust Senior Research Fellow. Hacker retired from Oxford in 2006, and was appointed  to an emeritus research fellowship from 2006 to 2015, since when he has been an emeritus fellow. He was made an honorary fellow of The Queen's College, Oxford, in 2010. He was a part-time professor of philosophy at the University of Kent at Canterbury from 2013 to 2016. He was appointed to an honorary professorship at the Institute of Neurology at University College, London, for the period 2019–2024.

Philosophical views
Hacker is one of the most powerful contemporary exponents of the linguistic-therapeutic approach to philosophy pioneered by Ludwig Wittgenstein. In this approach, the words and concepts used by the language community are taken as given, and the role of philosophy is to resolve or dissolve philosophical problems by giving an overview of the uses of these words and the structural relationships between these concepts. Philosophical inquiry is therefore very different from scientific inquiry, and Hacker maintains that: "philosophy is not a contribution to human knowledge, but to human understanding." He believes that empirical observation and research is a categorically distinct kind of activity from conceptual investigation and clarification, even though there is sometimes no sharp dividing line between the two. These are two different kinds of intellectual activity, which may be conducted by the same person (as in the case of Einstein) or by different people. This has led him into direct disagreement with "neuro-philosophers": neuroscientists or philosophers such as Antonio Damasio and Daniel Dennett who think that neuroscience can shed light on philosophical questions such as the nature of consciousness or the mind-body problem. Hacker argues that these are indeed problems, only not empirical ones. They are conceptual problems and puzzlements that are to be dissolved or resolved by logico-linguistic analysis. It follows that scientific inquiry (learning more facts about humans or the world) does not help to resolve them anymore than discoveries in physics can help to prove a mathematical theorem. 
His 2003 book "Philosophical Foundations of Neuroscience", co-authored with neuroscientist Max Bennett, contains an exposition of these views, and critiques of the ideas of many contemporary neuroscientists and philosophers, including Francis Crick, Antonio Damasio, Daniel Dennett, John Searle, and others.

Hacker in general finds many received components of current philosophy of mind to be incoherent.  He rejects mind-brain identity theories, as well as functionalism, eliminativism and other forms of reductionism.  He advocates methodological pluralism, denying that standard explanations of human conduct are causal, and insisting on the irreducibility of explanation in terms of reasons and goals.  He denies that psychological attributes can be intelligibly ascribed to the brain, insisting that they are ascribable only to the human being as a whole.  He has endeavoured to show that the puzzles and 'mysteries' of consciousness dissolve under careful analysis of the various forms of intransitive and transitive consciousness, and that so-called qualia are no more than a philosopher's fiction.

Since 2005 Hacker has completed an ambitious tetralogy on human nature. He conceives of this to be philosophical anthropology – a study of the conceptual forms and relations in terms of which we think about ourselves and our theoretical and practical powers. The first volume The Categorial Framework: a Study of Human Nature surveys the most general concepts: substance, causation, powers, agency, teleology and rationality, mind, body and person. The second, The Intellectual Powers: A Study of Human Nature investigates consciousness, intentionality and mastery of a language as marks of the mind. This is followed by detailed logico-grammatical studies of human cognitive and cogitative powers, ranging from perception through knowledge and belief to memory, thought and imagination. The third volume The Passions: a Study of Human Nature is dedicated to the study of the emotions, ranging from pride, shame, jealousy and anger to love, friendship, and sympathy. It draws extensively on literary, dramatic and poetic sources. The concluding volume The Moral Powers: a Study of Human Nature is concerned with good and evil; freedom, determinism, and responsibility; pleasure and happiness; finding meaning in life and the place of death in life. Hacker's methodology is connective analysis in which the wide range of conceptual and logical features of the relevant subjects is laid bare.

Hacker has frequently collaborated with fellow Oxford philosopher G. P. Baker, and Australian neuroscientist Max Bennett.

Works

Books 
 Insight and Illusion: Wittgenstein on Philosophy and the Metaphysics of Experience (Clarendon Press, Oxford, 1972)
 Insight and Illusion – themes in the philosophy of Wittgenstein (extensively revised edition) (Clarendon Press, Oxford, 1986)
 Wittgenstein : Understanding and Meaning, Volume 1 of an analytical commentary on the Philosophical Investigations (Blackwell, Oxford, and Chicago University Press, Chicago, 1980)()()(), co-authored with G.P. Baker. It was extensively revised in 2009 and published in two parts by Wiley-Blackwell()().
 Frege : Logical Excavations, (Blackwell, Oxford, O.U.P., N.Y., 1984) co-authored with G.P. Baker.
 Language, Sense and Nonsense, a critical investigation into modern theories of language (Blackwell, 1984) co-authored with G.P. Baker.
 Scepticism, Rules and Language (Blackwell, 1984) co-authored with G.P. Baker.
 Wittgenstein : Rules, Grammar, and Necessity – Volume 2 of an analytical commentary on the Philosophical Investigations (Blackwell, Oxford, UK and Cambridge, Massachusetts, 1985)() co-authored with G.P. Baker. It was extensively revised in 2014
 Appearance and Reality – a philosophical investigation into perception and perceptual qualities (Blackwell, 1987)
 Wittgenstein : Meaning and Mind, Volume 3 of an Analytical Commentary on the Philosophical Investigations (Blackwell, Oxford and Cambridge, Massachusetts, 1990). It was extensively revised in 2019 and published in two parts by Wiley-Blackwell().
 Wittgenstein: Mind and Will, Volume 4 of an Analytical Commentary on the Philosophical Investigations (Blackwell, 1996)
 Wittgenstein's Place in Twentieth Century Analytic Philosophy (Blackwell, Oxford, UK and Cambridge, Massachusetts, 1996)
 Wittgenstein on Human Nature (Weidenfeld and Nicolson, London, 1997)
 Wittgenstein: Connections and Controversies (Clarendon Press, Oxford, 2001)
 Philosophical Foundations of Neuroscience (Blackwell, Oxford, and Malden, Mass., 2003), co-authored with Max Bennett
 Neuroscience and Philosophy: Brain, Mind, and Language (Columbia University Press, New York, 2007), co-authored with Max Bennett, D. Dennett, and J. Searle
 Human Nature: The Categorial Framework (Blackwell, 2007)
 History of Cognitive Neuroscience (Wiley, Blackwell, 2008), co-authored with Max Bennett
 The Intellectual Powers: A study of Human Nature (Wiley-Blackwell, Oxford, 2013)  pb. ed.
 Wittgenstein: Comparisons & Context (Oxford University Press, Oxford, 2013) 
 The Passions: A study of Human Nature (Wiley-Blackwell, Oxford, 2017) 
 Intellectual Entertainments: Eight Dialogues on Mind, Consciousness and Thought  (Anthem Press, London, 2020) 
 The Moral Powers: a Study of Human Nature (Wiley-Blackwell, Oxford, 2020)

References

External links
 Peter Hacker's web page.
 http://www.thetimes.co.uk/tto/arts/books/article3941128.ece

1939 births
20th-century English philosophers
20th-century essayists
21st-century English philosophers
21st-century essayists
Analytic philosophers
British consciousness researchers and theorists
English essayists
English logicians
English male non-fiction writers
Epistemologists
Fellows of St John's College, Oxford
Linguistic turn
Living people
Metaphilosophers
Metaphysicians
Ontologists
Ordinary language philosophy
Philosophers of language
Philosophers of logic
Philosophers of mind
Philosophers of psychology
Philosophers of science
Wittgensteinian philosophers